Wanshou Palace is a Taoist palace in Nanchang City, Jiangxi Province, China.

Buildings and structures in Nanchang
Religion in Jiangxi